Guayubín is a town in the Monte Cristi province of the Dominican Republic. It is Monte Cristi's second-largest town.

They hold annual festivities from August 1 until about August 10, where they celebrate their saint, which is San Lorenzo (Saint Lawrence). Each festivity is filled with music, live activities including softball, volleyball and baseball tournaments and performances by recognized artists and comedians as well as a designated trio of queens (juvenil, internacional and infantil—juvenile, international and children's) along with a vice-queen, princess, ambassador, etc. for each queen who are chosen by the residents or by the organizing committee.

Sources 
 – World-Gazetteer.com

References 

Populated places in Monte Cristi Province
Municipalities of the Dominican Republic